Push and shove may refer to:

Push and Shove (album), by No Doubt, 2012
"Push and Shove" (song), the title song
Push and shove router, a type of router supported by various EDA layout programs

See also
A Push and a Shove, a 2007 novel by Christopher Kelly